Kelsey-Woodlawn  is a combination of industrial park nestled between the North West Industrial SDA and the Central Industrial of down town Saskatoon.  It is still serviced by the CNR rail lines to both the north and east.  There are two older neighbourhoods, one still survives near SIAST - Kelsey institute on Idylwyld Drive North, and the other is the McVicar Addition near the Woodlawn Cemetery.

Location
Within the Lawson Suburban Development Area (West Side), the Kelsey-Woodlawn neighbourhood spans as far north as the north industrial area bearing 40th Street as its northern perimeter.  The CNR train track marks the eastern boundary at Warman Road, thus encompassing the Woodlawn Cemetery.  The southernmost road within Kelsey-Woodlawn is 33rd Street East, and the western edge includes all the places along Idylwyld Drive.  Most homes were built prior to the 1960s with no new construction virtually after 1980 at all and the main tenants would be students attending SIAST on 33rd Street and Idylwyld Drive.

Layout

Along the Woodlawn Cemetery is a small neighbourhood known as the "McVicar Addition"   The other residential community in the Kelsey Woodlawn subdivision are those who reside in the places which branch off Idylwyld Drive.  These places are named after governors general of Canada.

Throughout the remainder of the area, the streets are numerically numbered from 33rd Street and continue north to 40th Street.  The avenues are named after the provinces of Canada.

History
The Wood Lawn Cemetery is the only active municipal cemetery within city limits.  It replaced the first cemetery - Nutana Pioneer Cemetery in 1910.

Next of Kin Memorial Avenue is bedecked with many planted trees honoring those who gave the ultimate sacrifice in war engagements.  This Road of Remembrance was designated in 1993 as a National Historic Site.

Government and politics
Kelsey-Woodlawn exists within the federal electoral district of Saskatoon West. It is currently represented by Brad Redekopp of the Conservative Party of Canada, first elected in 2019.

Provincially, the area is within the constituency of Saskatoon Meewasin. It is currently represented by Ryan Meili of the Saskatchewan New Democratic Party, first elected in a 2017 by-election.

In Saskatoon's non-partisan municipal politics, Kelsey-Woodlawn lies within ward 1. It is currently represented by Darren Hill, first elected in 2006.

Education

St. Michael Community School - separate (Catholic) elementary, part of Greater Saskatoon Catholic Schools

Shopping

Within Kelsey-Woodlawn are industrial areas interspersed with the residential areas.  The business and industrial areas stem off the Central Business District Warehouse area.  The CNR rail yards were first located down town, and there are still CPR spur lines throughout the Kelsey Woodlawn Subdivision.  Shopping is available at several various strip malls along Idylwyld Drive North, Quebec Avenue and 33rd Street East.

Area Parks
Dr. J. Valens Park  
Industrial Park

Transportation 
Idylwyld Drive has had many titles: Avenue A, Highway 11 and most currently Louis Riel Trail.  It is a main thoroughfare through the city connecting Regina, Saskatoon and Prince Albert, Saskatchewan.  It also connects west Saskatoon with the bedroom communities of Warman and Martensville

City Transit
Kelsey-Woodlawn serviced by City Transit Bus Routes Saskatoon Transit.

References

External links

Local Area Planning
Selling an Idea or a Product
City of Saskatoon City of Saskatoon · Departments · Community Services · City Planning · ZAM Maps
Populace Spring 2006

Neighbourhoods in Saskatoon